Frank Rollason Mitchell (3 June 1922 – 4 April 1984) was an Australian-born professional footballer who played as a wing half. He played over 350 games in the Football League, including 86 in the First Division. He also played county cricket for Warwickshire.

Cricket career
Mitchell was born in Goulburn, New South Wales, Australia, and moved to England when a teenager. His main sport was cricket, and he joined the Warwickshire ground staff at 15. 

Mitchell played 17 first-class matches for Warwickshire between 1946 and 1948, taking 22 wickets at an average of 38.9 with his right-arm medium-pace or off-break bowling, making 229 runs at an average of 8.29 and taking seven catches. He played for and became groundsman and secretary of Knowle and Dorridge Cricket Club.

Football career
He began his football career as an amateur with Coventry City, and made guest appearances during the Second World War with several clubs, including Birmingham, who were sufficiently impressed to sign him on professional forms in 1943. He had a calm temperament and became the club's regular penalty-taker. In 1946 he played for an England XI against a Scotland XI in an unofficial friendly international to raise money for the victims of the Burnden Park disaster.

After 106 games for Birmingham he moved to Chelsea in January 1949. He made 85 appearances for Chelsea before in 1952 moving to Watford where he finished his career, playing nearly 200 league games for the club before he retired in 1958.

Death
He died at Lapworth, Warwickshire, aged 61.

Honours
 Birmingham City
Football League South (wartime league) champions 1946.
Football League Second Division champions 1948.

References

Post War English & Scottish Football League A–Z Player's Database
Frank Mitchell at cricinfo

Notes

1922 births
Sportsmen from New South Wales
1984 deaths
Australian soccer players
Association football midfielders
Coventry City F.C. players
Birmingham City F.C. players
Chelsea F.C. players
Watford F.C. players
Arsenal F.C. wartime guest players
Warwickshire cricketers
Australian cricketers
Cornwall cricketers
Australian emigrants to England